John G. Kerr Company is a historic commercial building located at South Bend, St. Joseph County, Indiana. It was built in 1891, and is a three-story, Italianate style brick building. It round arched windows and a cast iron storefront.  It is located next to the Second St. Joseph Hotel.

It was listed on the National Register of Historic Places in 1985.

References

Commercial buildings on the National Register of Historic Places in Indiana
Italianate architecture in Indiana
Commercial buildings completed in 1891
Buildings and structures in South Bend, Indiana
National Register of Historic Places in St. Joseph County, Indiana